Lawrence Demmy (1931 – 9 December 2016) was a British ice dancer. With partner Jean Westwood, he was the World Champion for four consecutive years, 1952 to 1955 (plus the unofficial trial event in 1951), and European Champion in its first two editions in 1954 and 1955.

They were inducted into the World Figure Skating Hall of Fame in 1977.

Results
(with Jean Westwood)

References

British male ice dancers
1931 births
2016 deaths
World Figure Skating Championships medalists
European Figure Skating Championships medalists
Date of birth missing
Sportspeople from Manchester
Jewish British sportspeople
20th-century English Jews 
English people of Polish-Jewish descent